László Halász (12 February 1930 – 1997) was a Hungarian rower. He competed in the men's coxed pair event at the 1952 Summer Olympics.

References

1930 births
1997 deaths
Hungarian male rowers
Olympic rowers of Hungary
Rowers at the 1952 Summer Olympics
Rowers from Budapest